Katarina Tomasevski (8 February 1953 – 4 October 2006) was, from 1998 to 2004, the first United Nations Special Rapporteur on the right to education of the United Nations Commission on Human Rights. She was born in Yugoslavia, studied law at the University of Zagreb (PhD 1980) and at Harvard University (LLM 1977). She wrote more than 200 articles and taught at many universities, including University of Lund, Harvard School of Public Health, the London School of Economics, the UN University and Peking University.

Books
Responding to human rights violations, 1946–1999. Martinus Nijhoff Publishers, 2002. 
Education Denied: Costs and Remedies. Zed Books, 2003
The State of the Right to Education Worldwide Free or Fee: 2006 Global Report.

References

External links
 www.right-to-education.org, accessed August 2009
 www.katarinatomasevski.com
www.tomasevski.net, archived 16 March, 2016

1953 births
2006 deaths
United Nations special rapporteurs
Danish activists
Danish women activists
Croatian lawyers
Education activists
Croatian officials of the United Nations
Yugoslav lawyers
University of Zagreb alumni
Harvard Law School alumni